International Day of Education is an annual international observance day held on January 24 and is dedicated to education. On December 3, 2018, the United Nations General Assembly adopted a resolution proclaiming January 24 as International Day of Education, in celebration of the role of education for bringing global peace and sustainable development.

History 
January 24 was declared the international Day of Education by a resolution that was passed by the United Nations General Assembly (UNGA) on 3rd December 2018. Thereafter, on 24th January 2019 the first International Day of Education was celebrated. The message by UNGA is being spread across the globe. Their sincere efforts world wide have shown promising results in the betterment of an educated individual that constitute a cultured society, which is supported with optimism and opportunities.

See also 

 Education
 Teachers' Day
 Teacher's Oath
 World Teachers' Day

References

External links 
 United Nations - International Day of Education
 UNESCO - International Day of Education

 United Nations days
January observances
Education events